Barbie is a fashion doll launched in 1959.

Barbie may also refer to:

Food 

 Barbie is an Australian nickname for BBQ’s

Given name
 Barbie Forteza (born 1997), Filipina television actress
 Barbie Ferreira (born 1996), American actress
 Barbie Hsu (born 1976), Taiwanese actress
 Barbie Imperial (born 1998), Filipina actress
 Barbie Wilde (born 1960), Canadian actress and writer
 Barbie the Welder, American metal sculptor Barbara Parsons

Nickname
 Edgar Valdez Villarreal (born 1973), Mexican-American drug lord nicknamed "La Barbie"
 Kelly Kelly (born 1987), professional wrestler and model Barbara Jean "Barbie" Blank
 Nicki Minaj (born 1982), American rapper and singer nicknamed "Barbie"

Surname
 Klaus Barbie (1913-1991), SS and Gestapo officer and war criminal

Arts and entertainment
 Barbie (1984 video game), for the Commodore 64
 Barbie (1991 video game), for PC and the Nintendo Entertainment System
 The Barbie media franchise featuring the popular doll in film, television and web media
 Barbie (film), an upcoming live-action romantic comedy film based on the eponymous fashion doll directed by Greta Gerwig

In music
 "Barbie" a 1962 recording by The Beach Boys originaly credited as Kenny & the Cadets
 "Barbie" a 2023 song by D-Block Europe

See also
 Barbe (disambiguation)
 Barbee (disambiguation)
 Barbey (disambiguation)
 Barbi (disambiguation)
 Barby (disambiguation)